The Canada women's national under-16 and under-17 basketball team is a national basketball team of Canada, governed by Canada Basketball.

It represents the country in international under-16 and under-17 (under age 16 and under age 17) women's basketball competitions.

World Cup record

See also
Canada women's national basketball team
Canada women's national under-19 basketball team
Canada men's national under-17 basketball team

References

External links

Archived records of Canada team participations

under
Women's national under-17 basketball teams